Bill C-12 refers to various legislation introduced into the House of Commons of Canada, including:
 An Act to amend the Criminal Code (protection of children and other vulnerable persons) and the Canada Evidence Act, introduced in 2004 to the third session of the 37th Parliament; not passed but subsequently re-introduced
 Safeguarding Canadians' Personal Information Act, introduced in 2011 to the first session of the 41st Parliament; not passed

Canadian federal legislation